The men's triple jump event of the athletics events at the 2011 Pan American Games was held  the 27 of October at the Telmex Athletics Stadium. The defending Pan American Games champion is Jadel Gregório of the Brazil.

Records
Prior to this competition, the existing world and Pan American Games records were as follows:

Qualification
Each National Olympic Committee (NOC) was able to enter up to two entrants providing they had met the minimum standard (16.60) in the qualifying period (January 1, 2010 to September 14, 2011).

Schedule

Results
All distances shown are in meters:centimeters

Final
The final was held on October 27.

References

Athletics at the 2011 Pan American Games
2011